Krasnodarsky (masculine), Krasnodarskaya (feminine), or Krasnodarskoye (neuter) is the name of several rural localities in Russia:
Krasnodarsky, Krasnodar Krai, a khutor in Krasnoarmeysky District of Krasnodar Krai
Krasnodarsky, Stavropol Krai, a khutor in Razdolnensky Selsoviet of Novoalexandrovsky District of Stavropol Krai
Krasnodarskoye, a selo in Krasnodarsky Selsoviet of Ust-Pristansky District of Altai Krai